Springfield Park is a  park in Liverpool,  England. 

It is located in the suburb of Knotty Ash, and lies to the north of Prescot Road. Much of the park is now occupied by the newly rebuilt Alder Hey Children's Hospital, which opened in October 2015. The park has a direct track that links to the Trans Pennine Trail. It also has a path that leads into Alder Veterinary Hospital's Car-park and then continues to Eaton Road.

History
Springfield was originally the estate and grounds of Springfield House, one of a number of  wealthy properties on the outskirts of the city. After a succession of owners,  the estate was acquired in 1907 by Liverpool City corporation as a public amenity.
The house, which stood in the north-west corner of the park, and the lodge at the front entrance, are no longer standing.

Features
The park has a number of features, but consists mainly of green space. There is an area that is situated next to the nearby Alder Hey Children’s Alder Hey Children’s Hospital that mainly consists of flower Flower beds and has a lambanana . It also has a children’s playground on the site of the house, though no trace of the house remains.

The park also contains an obelisk commemorating the death of Lord Nelson, which stands inside the main entrance. It was made on the orders of a Mr Downward, a sugar merchant of the city, who owned Springfield House at the time. It was offered to the city as a bequest, but the city council rejected it as being too small (one councillor dismissing it as "a half-nelson"). Insulted by this, Downward had the obelisk erected in the grounds of his home, where it remains.
It was Grade II Listed in June 1985.

Alder Hey in the Park 
In 2012 proposals to rebuild Alder Hey Children's Hospital were announced and the construction of the new hospital broke ground in the Springfield Park in January 2013, taking a total of two years to build. The new hospital opened in October 2015 and plans include demolishing the original Alder Hey buildings then transforming the old hospital site by be reclaiming the land as new park space for the surrounding community.

References
 Colin Twist, Parks and Gardens of Liverpool
 Derek Whale, Lost villages of Liverpool

External links
The Friends of Springfield Park Liverpool  http://www.springfieldparkliverpool.org.uk/

Parks and commons in Liverpool